Timonovo is a rural locality (a selo) and the administrative center of Timonovskoye Rural Settlement, Valuysky District, Belgorod Oblast, Russia. The population was 479 as of 2010. There are 7 streets.

History 
On 18 August 2022, during the Russian invasion of Ukraine, the village was evacuated due to a fire at an ammunition store.

Geography 
Timonovo is located 15 km north of Valuyki (the district's administrative centre) by road. Basovo is the nearest rural locality.

References 

Rural localities in Valuysky District
Buildings and structures destroyed during the 2022 Russian invasion of Ukraine